James Ross, 4th Lord Ross of Halkhead (died 2 April 1581) was a Scottish nobleman and an adherent to the cause of Mary, Queen of Scots.

Origins
Ross was the second, but oldest surviving son of Ninian Ross, 3rd Lord Ross, who died in February 1555/6. The Rosses of Halkhead, or Hawkhead, in Renfrewshire, were a Lowland family, not apparently related to the Earls of Ross or the Highland family of Ross of Balnagown.

Career
Having promised on 5 September 1565 to faithfully serve Queen Mary and Lord Darnley against the rebellious lords, Lord Ross was ordered on 10 October 1565 to accompany the vanguard of the Queen's army in pursuit of the rebels. Mary and Rizzio were frequent visitors to Ross's estate at Melville, though there were later suggestions by Lord Ruthven that Rizzio and Ross fell out when Ross refused to give Rizzio the lordship of Melville.

On 19 April 1567, Ross was among the Lords signing the Ainslie Tavern Bond to indicate their agreement to the marriage between Bothwell and the Queen and, on 8 May 1568, he signed a bond for defence of the Queen at Hamilton. He took part in the Battle of Langside on 13 May 1568, but was captured by the Regent Moray. Ten years later, in 1578, he appeared in a list of nobles still adhering to the Queen.

As a Roman Catholic, he was excommunicated on 20 June 1573, alongside his brother-in-law, Lord Sempill.

He died on 2 April 1581.

Family
Ross married Jean, daughter of Robert Sempill, 3rd Lord Sempill (a descendant of Robert II of Scotland, Robert III of Scotland) and also Sir John Ross, 1st Lord of Ross of Halkhead ) who died 28 February 1593. By her, he had issue:
 Robert Ross, 5th Lord Ross
 William Ross, 10th Lord Ross
 Elizabeth, who married (contract 20 November 1582) Allan Lockhart, one of the Lockharts of Cleghorn. This couple were ancestors of Bill Clinton, 42nd President of the U.S.A.
 Jean, who married first Sir James Sandilands of Calder and secondly (contract 29 July 1580) Henry Stewart of Craigiehall
 Dorothy, who married Alexander Cunningham of Aiket
 Alison, or Alice, or Helen, who married Sir John Melville of Carnbee
 Grisel, who married (contract 18 March 1589/90) Sir Archibald Stirling of Keir and died on 3 October 1618.

References

History of Renfrewshire
People from Renfrewshire
1581 deaths
Year of birth unknown
Lords of Parliament (pre-1707)